Cnemidophorus pseudolemniscatus, Colee's racerunner, is a species of teiid lizard found in Suriname and French Guiana.

References

pseudolemniscatus
Reptiles of French Guiana
Reptiles of Suriname
Reptiles described in 1993
Taxa named by Charles J. Cole
Taxa named by Herbert C. Dessauer